Austin "Ap" Applewhite was a college football player for University of Mississippi, captain of the 1927 team, and selected All-Southern.

References 

American football ends
Ole Miss Rebels football players
All-Southern college football players